Trifolium beckwithii is a species of clover known by the common name Beckwith's clover.

Distribution
It is native to the western United States, from northeastern California, Oregon, Nevada and Utah in the Great Basin region, to Montana and into South Dakota.

Habitats include yellow pine forest, red fir forest, mountain meadows, and wetland−riparian areas.

Description
Trifolium beckwithii is a perennial herb growing upright in form. Most of the leaves are basal, except for one pair growing higher on the stem. The leaf is made up of oval leaflets up to 4 centimeters long and the stipules are large.

The inflorescence is a head of flowers 2 to 3 centimeters wide. The flower corolla is pink, purplish, or bicolored. The flowers droop on the head as they age.

References

External links
 Calflora Database: Trifolium beckwithii (Beckwith's clover)
Jepson Manual eFlora (TJM2) treatment of  Trifolium beckwithii
UC CalPhotos gallery: Trifolium beckwithii

beckwithii
Flora of California
Flora of Nevada
Flora of the Northwestern United States
Flora of South Dakota
Flora of Utah
Flora of the Great Basin
Flora of the Sierra Nevada (United States)
Flora without expected TNC conservation status